The spotted slender gecko (Hemiphyllodactylus pardalis) is a species of gecko. It is endemic to Thailand.

References

Hemiphyllodactylus
Reptiles described in 2020
Endemic fauna of Thailand
Reptiles of Thailand